Intracellular delivery is the process of introducing external materials into living cells. Materials that are delivered into cells include nucleic acids (DNA and RNA), proteins, peptides, impermeable small molecules, synthetic nanomaterials, organelles, and micron-scale tracers, devices and objects.
Such molecules and materials can be used to investigate cellular behavior, engineer cell operations or correct a pathological function.

Medical applications of intracellular delivery range from in vitro fertilisation (IVF)
 and mRNA vaccines

to gene therapy

and preparation of CAR-T cells
.
Industrial applications include protein production

, biomanufacture

, and genetic engineering of plants and animals
.
Intracellular delivery is a fundamental technique in the study of biology and genetics, such as the use of DNA plasmid transfection to investigate protein function in living cells
.
A wide range of approaches exist for performing intracellular delivery including biological, chemical and physical techniques that work through either membrane disruption or packaging the delivery material in carriers
.

Intracellular delivery is at the intersection of cell biology and technology, and is related to many fields across science and medicine including genetics, biotechnology, bioengineering and drug delivery.

Applications

Analogous to the way computers operate through electronic signals, cells process and transmit information through molecules. Depending on the molecules and materials that are loaded into cells, different outcomes or applications can be achieved (see Figure "Applications of Intracellular Delivery" for examples). Below are some of the main classifications of cargo materials used to investigate and engineer cells through intracellular delivery.

Cargo Types

Nucleic Acids
Transfection refers to the intracellular delivery of nucleic acids: DNA, RNA and their analogues. Nucleic acids materials that are commonly transfected into cells are plasmid DNA, mRNA, siRNA, and oligonucleotides. The transfection applications span across 3 main areas: 
 Basic biological research,
 biomanufacture, and
 gene and cell-based therapies
.
In basic research, transfection is a cornerstone technique in fields ranging from cell biology and genetics to immunology and drug discovery
.
In biomanufacture, transfection is used for production of proteins, antibodies, viral vectors, and virus-like particles for vaccines.
In cell-based therapies transfection is used for applications such as ex-vivo gene therapy
,
hematopoietic stem cell engineering

,production of induced pluripotent stem cells
, 
and ex-vivo preparation of cells for immunotherapy

Over the last 50 years nucleic acid transfection has been the most common subcategory of intracellular delivery.

Plasmid DNA began to be transfected into animal cells for the purpose of gene expression in the late 1970s via microinjection

and calcium phosphate methods
. 
Since then, it has been used to investigate gene and protein function in manifold studies. DNA plasmids are physically large and cumbersome molecules with a 5-10 kilo-basepair plasmid being >100 nm diameter in solution when free and uncondensed. 
Nevertheless, due to the well-established and relatively low-cost techniques for editing and preparing them, they have been very commonly used in biological research.

In the 1970s it was shown that microinjection of mRNA resulted in protein expression
.
In certain situations, mRNA transfection is considered advantageous for inducing protein expression compared with DNA plasmids due the following reasons

 reduced risk of genomic integration, 
 does not require nuclear delivery with cytosolic delivery being sufficient, 
 protein expression is dose-dependent and rapid, 
 less toxic and immunogenic than DNA vectors when appropriately chemically modified.
Thus, mRNA is considered a better option than DNA for most therapeutic applications although it is more expensive and intrinsically unstable.

Oligonucleotides are single or double-stranded sequences of DNA or RNA of less than 30 nucleotides in length. Small interfering RNA (siRNAs) are short 21-22 base pair duplexes of RNA that can be transfected into cells to silence gene expression
.
Since their Nobel prize winning discovery in 1998, siRNA have been transfected into cells in thousands of biological studies in order to perturb gene function. Other oligonucleotides of interest for intracellular delivery include antisense oligonucleotides (ASOs), micro RNAs (miRNAs), and aptamers. Such oligonucleotides can be used to alter cell behaviour through several different mechanisms
.

Lipid nanoparticles and electroporation are currently widespread strategies for nucleic acid transfection. However, effective transfection remains a hurdle in many primary cells, stem cells, patient-derived cells and neurons
.
The ability to conduct biological research and carry out potential medical applications in such cells is often limited by transfection efficiency and tolerance to treatment. Furthermore, there is currently a poor understanding of the long-term effects of performing transfection on cells within the human body.

Proteins and Peptides 
Delivery of proteins into living cells, such as genome-editing nucleases, active inhibitory antibodies, or stimulatory transcription factors, represents a powerful toolset for manipulating and analyzing cell function
.
Furthermore, effective intracellular delivery could expand the repertoire of usable protein drugs as most current protein-based therapeutics hit extracellular targets and this is a frontier of current research efforts
.

Delivery of purified proteins into cells began as early as the 1960s. Examples include amoeba microinjected with ferritin
 and mouse eggs microinjected with bovine albumin. Because proteins have diverse size, shape and charge, they cannot easily be delivered into cells with one-size-fits-all solutions that cationic lipids use for nucleic acid transfection. In contrast, a diverse range of methods have been used to deliver proteins into cells including: microinjection, osmotic lysis of pinosomes, hypotonic shock, scrape loading, bead loading, syringe loading, detergent exposure, electroporation, pore-forming toxins, cell penetrating peptides, nanocarriers, cell squeezing, nanoneedles, acoustic perturbations, and vapor nanobubbles
.
For the purposes of genome editing, Cas9 protein combined with sgRNA has been delivered by methods ranging from electroporation, microinjection, lipid nanoparticle formulations, osmotically induced endocytosis followed by endosome disruption, microfluidic deformation, and cell penetrating peptides among others
.

Small Molecules 
Small molecules requiring intracellular delivery include:
 impermeable small molecule drugs,
 small molecule probes, and
 cryoprotectants.
An example of the former is bleomycin, an anticancer drug with poor permeability due to its positive charge and hydrophobicity. By performing intracellular delivery with electroporation, bleomycin potency can be increased more than a hundred-fold
.
As for small molecule probes, when delivered to the cell interior, these molecules are capable of reporting cellular properties such as membrane potential, pH, and concentrations of ions
.
One example is PFBI, a fluorescent dye that can be employed for measurement of intracellular potassium concentration. Finally, some candidate cryoprotectant molecules such as impermeable sugars are highly hydrophilic and do not ready diffuse across cell membranes. For example, trehalose (Mw = 342 Da) is a natural disaccharide synthesized by a range of organisms to help them withstand desiccation or freezing. Trehalose loaded into animal cells at concentrations up to 200 mM has been shown to provide excellent cryoprotection during freezing and thawing
.

Microscale Cargo 
Cargo materials in the microscale have been successfully delivered into cells for a variety of applications. For a century microinjection has been the dominant method for introducing microscale cargo into cells. A classic example was the transplant of a somatic cell nucleus into a frog egg to demonstrate that nuclei from fully differentiated somatic cells could grow into a new animal when inserted into an egg
.
Microinjection was first used to inject sperm into eggs as a proof of concept for IVF in animals
.
Artificial chromosomes have been engineered and transferred into cells by microinjection for proof-of-concept gene therapy
. 
Transplant of mitochondria has also been demonstrated in several cell types via microinjection
.
More recently laser-triggered cavitation bubbles have been used to open transient holes in the cell membrane for the purpose of delivering bacteria and mitochondria
.
Using microinjection or ballistic propulsion, micron-scale particles, spheres, and beads have been loaded into cells for cellular microrheology studies that assess internal mechanical behavior of cells
.
For example, using microinjected PEGylated tracer beads of up to 5.6 micron, it was shown that motor-driven cytoplasmic mixing substantially enhanced intracellular movement of both small and large cellular components
.

Others 
Other materials of interest for intracellular delivery include carbon nanotubes, quantum dots, magnetic nanoparticles, and nanodevices that serve as sensors or probes

Medical Applications

The following are examples of medical treatments that rely on intracellular delivery in at least one step.

Hematopoietic stem cell-based gene therapies:
 Strimvelis for the treatment of adenosine deaminase severe combined immunodeficiency (ADA-SCID), produced through ex vivo gamma retroviral vector gene delivery of a functional adenosine deaminase (ADA) gene (European approval granted 2017). Strimvelis was the first ex vivo autologous gene therapy to gain approval from the European Medicines Agency. 
 Atidarsagene autotemcel (branded as Libmeldy) for the treatment of metachromatic leukodystrophy (MLD), produced through ex vivo lentiviral gene delivery of a functional human arylsulfatase A (ARSA) gene (European approval granted 2020).
 Betibeglogene autotemcel (branded as Zynteglo) for the treatment of transfusion-dependent beta thalassemia (TDT), produced through ex vivo lentiviral gene delivery of a functional human HBB gene (European and US approvals granted 2022).

CAR-T cell immunotherapies:
 Tisagenlecleucel (branded as Kymriah) for the treatment of B-cell acute lymphoblastic leukemia (B-Cell ALL), produced through ex vivo lentiviral gene delivery of a CAR gene targeting CD-19 (US approval granted 2017).
 Axicabtagene Ciloleucel (branded as Yescarta) for the treatment of large B-cell lymphoma, produced through ex vivo gamma retroviral gene delivery of a CAR gene targeting CD-19 (US approval granted 2017).
 Brexucabtagene Autoleucel (branded as Tecartus) for the treatment of adult patients with relapsed/refractory mantle cell lymphoma (r/r MCL), produced through ex vivo gamma retroviral gene delivery of a CAR gene targeting CD-19 (US approval granted 2021).

In vivo viral vector-mediated gene therapy:
 Onasemnogene Abeparvovec (branded as Zolgesma) for the treatment of spinal muscular atrophy, administered by intravenous infusion of a AAV9 viral vector that delivers a functional SMN1 transgene to the affected motor neurons (US approval granted 2019).
 Voretigene neparvovec (branded as Luxturna) for the treatment of Leber congenital amaurosis (an inherited retinal disorder causing progressive blindness), administered by subretinal injection of a AAV2 viral vector that delivers a functional copy of the RPE65 gene to eye cells to compensate for the RPE65 mutation (US approval granted 2017).

siRNA medicines:
 Patisiran (Onpattro) for the treatment of polyneuropathy in people with hereditary transthyretin-mediated amyloidosis, administered by intravenous infusion of siRNA formulated into lipid nanoparticles that gain entry into liver cells to silence the expression of pathogenic transthyretin mRNA (US and European approval granted 2018).
 Givosiran (Givlaari) for the treatment of adults with acute hepatic porphyria, administered by administered by intravenous infusion of siRNA-GalNAc conjugates that gain entry into liver hepatocytes to silence the expression of pathogenic aminolevulinate synthase 1 (ALAS1) mRNA (US approval granted 2019).

mRNA vaccines:
 Moderna COVID-19 Vaccine (branded as Spikevax) designed to provide protection against COVID-19 caused by infection with the SARS-CoV-2 virus (US emergency use authorization 2020). It is administered by intramuscular injection of 0.5 mL doses of mRNA-LNP complexes in saline. Local injection has been reported to deliver mRNA-LNP complexes to resident/infiltrating APCs, related immune cells, and muscle cells, stimulating local expression
of covid spike protein to prime the immune system against future exposure to SARS-CoV-2.
 Pfizer-BioNTech COVID-19 Vaccine (branded as Comirnaty) designed to provide protection against COVID-19 caused by infection with the SARS-CoV-2 virus (US emergency use authorization 2020). The mechanism is the same as Moderna (above) except that composition of the lipid nanoparticles are different, with Pfizer using the ionizable lipid known as ALC-0315 while Moderna uses an ionizable lipid called SM-102.

Antisense oligonucleotides (ASOs):
 Mipomersen (branded as Kynamro), for the treatment of homozygous familial hypercholesterolaemia, administered by subcutaneous injection of chemically modified ASOs that accumulate into the liver with a half-life of ~30 days.
The ASOs gain entry into liver cells to prevent the expression of pathogenic ApoB mRNA (US approval granted 2013).
 Spinraza (branded as Nusinersen) for the treatment of Spinal Muscular Atrophy (SMA), administered by intrathecal injection of chemically modified ASOs that enter motor neuron cells, bind SMN2 mRNA, and alter the alternative splicing of the SMN2 gene to restore expression of the protein.

In vitro fertilisation (IVF) for human pregnancies:
 In cases such as low sperm count or motility, or where eggs cannot easily be penetrated by sperm, single sperm may be microinjected directly into the egg using a procedure termed intracytoplasmic sperm injection (ICSI). After injection the fertilised egg is incubated in a special growth medium for about 48 hours until the egg consists of six to eight cells. It is then transferred to the patient's uterus through a thin, plastic catheter, which goes through the vagina and cervix. The first human pregnancy generated by ICSI was carried out in 1991 by Gianpiero Palermo and his team. IVF through ICSI has facilitated millions of pregnancies worldwide since the 1990s.

Safety. Research is still in the early stages of understanding the immediate and long-term medical effects of intracellular delivery of materials to human cells. For example, investigations have shown that children born through ICSI suffer more health problems than those naturally conceived. However, it is not known whether this is due to poorer health of the parents reproductive systems or aspects of the IVF and ICSI procedure. HSC-based gene therapies prepared with gamma retroviral and lentiviral vectors have in some cases shown an increased risk of leukemia down the track due to genotoxicity, as occurred with Strimvelis. Furthermore, the lipids used for intracellular delivery of therapeutic siRNA and mRNA may cause inflammatory reactions. In the case of patisiran, pretreatment with multiple anti-inflammatory drugs is used to minimize reactions to the nanoparticle. There is currently little data available on the medical impact of intracellular delivery of novel chemical components of mRNA vaccines, such as SM-102 and ALC-0315, on both the short and long-term health of the recipient population. Thus, safety and unintended side-effects will continue to be a topic of importance for medical treatments that utilize intracellular delivery.

Categories of Methods

Current methods of intracellular delivery can be placed into two broad categories:
 Membrane disruption-mediated
 Carrier-mediated

Membrane Disruption
Membrane disruption-mediated techniques involve creating temporary holes in the cell membrane and delivering the cargo molecules via either

A) Permeabilization and diffusive influx of materials from the extracellular solution
B) Direct penetration with a vehicle or carrier that both punctures the plasma membrane and introduces the cargo of interest.
The plasma membrane of the cell can be disrupted through mechanical, electrical, chemical, optical or thermal means. Intracellular delivery methods that employ permeabilization include:
  Electroporation 
  Thermal treatments 
  Optoporation (usually with a laser)
  Cavitation effects (usually from ultrasound or laser/particle interactions)
  Fluid shear (usually via microfluidics or cavitation)
  Detergents/Surfactants
  Pore-forming toxins
  Osmotic/hydrostatic forces
  Direct mechanical methods like microfluidic cell squeezing, scrape loading, bead loading.
Intracellular delivery methods that utilize direct penetration include:
  Classic microinjection
  Newer forms of microinjection (e.g. Nanopipette, Automation etc.)
  Ballistic particles / Gene gun
  Nanoneedles and their variations such as Nanostraws, Nanospears and Nanowires.
 
Membrane disruption-mediated delivery methods can deliver almost any material that can be dispersed in solution, making them more universal than carrier-mediated methods. The major challenge for membrane disruption-mediated methods is to create holes of the optimal shape, size, location, and duration for the required delivery application. Excessive membrane damage should be avoided as it can kill cells or impair their function.

Carriers
Carrier-mediated delivery techniques package the cargo into or onto a nanoscale carrier, which then enters the cell to deliver the cargo. Carriers generally gain entry to the cell interior via either

 Endocytosis (the majority of carriers) or
 Fusion with the cell's plasma membrane 
However, there are rare reports of certain carriers crossing or transiently disrupting the plasma membrane through hitherto unknown mechanisms
.

Carrier-based approaches comprise various biochemical assemblies, mostly of molecular to nanoscale dimensions. The purpose of carriers is threefold,
 to package the cargo and protect it from degradation,
 to gain access to the intended intracellular compartment, and
 to release the payload at the appropriate time and location.
Carriers can be bio-inspired, such as reconstituted viruses, virus like particles, vesicles, cell ghosts, and functional ligands and peptides. They may be based upon synthesis techniques from chemistry, materials science and nanotechnology, involving assembly of macromolecular complexes from organic and inorganic origins. Carriers that have been used for intracellular delivery include:
 Polymer assemblies
 Lipid assemblies
 Liposomes (hollow with aqueous interior, unlike lipid assemblies)
 Salt complexes (e.g. CaPO4-nucleic acid condensates)
 Exosomes and other bio-inspired vesicles
 Cell-penetrating peptides (CPPs), also known as protein transduction domains (PTDs) 
 Ligand conjugates
 Protein or Sugar based nanoassemblies (e.g. Chitosan)
 Inorganic nanocarriers (e.g. mesoporous silica, metal nanoparticles, magnetic nanoparticles)
 Nanotechnology-based carriers (e.g. quantum dots, carbon nanotubes)
 Viral vectors (based on lentivirus, retrovirus, adenovirus, adeno-associated virus(AAV), and other viruses)
 Re-purposed bacterial toxins and viral components

Research into how carriers enter cells indicates that most carriers enter via endocytosis before escaping from endosomal compartments into the cytoplasm
.
Mechanisms of endocytosis available to nanocarriers include phagocytosis and pinocytosis through clathrin-dependent and clathrin-independent pathways
.
The internalization pathways employed by target cells depend on the size, shape, material composition, surface chemistry, and/or charge of the carrier
.
Cargo not able to escape endosomes are trafficked to lysosomes for degradation or recycled back to the cell surface
.
Efficiencies of around 1% endosomal escape have been reported for most non-viral carrier strategies, including lipid nanoparticles and cell-penetrating peptides
. 
Moreover, the exact mechanisms of endosome escape remain unclear and are a matter of ongoing research
.

Apart from endocytosis, some carriers are able to directly merge with the plasma membrane through fusion. Fusion events in biology include vesicle fusion, cell–cell fusion and cell–virus fusion. In these cases, juxtaposed membranes are pulled into close contact by specific protein–protein interactions and interfacial water is excluded to promote lipid mixing and subsequent fusion. Enveloped viruses may employ transmembrane viral proteins to mediate fusion with target cell membranes and this mechanism has been exploited for engineered intracellular delivery
. 
An early example was the use of sendai virus to fuse pre-loaded red blood cell ghosts with the plasma membrane of target cells
. 
A variation on this technique utilized expression of influenza hemagglutinin (HA) at the target cell membrane, which then binds sialic acid residues on the red blood cell surface to induce fusion
. 
Virosomes, which consist of viral membrane components reconstituted into liposomes or vesicles, also exhibit fusion capabilities for the purposes of intracellular delivery. Functional virosomes have been constructed with fusion components from sendai, influenza, vesicular stomatitis and other viruses
. 
Some exosomes and extracellular vesicles have been reported to fuse with target cells

and may furthermore be engineering to fuse on demand
. 
Interestingly, fusogenic liposomes used for protein delivery have been reported to be capable of fusion by modulating only the lipid composition without any need for the presence of fusogenic proteins or peptides
. 
Fusogenic carriers that have been used for intracellular delivery include

(1) cell ghosts, dead cells that have had their cytoplasm replaced with cargo,
(2) virosomes, cargo-loaded vesicles reconstituted to display functional viral proteins, and 
(3) fusogenic liposomes.

Viral vectors. Viral vectors exploit the viral infection pathway to enter cells but avoid the subsequent expression of viral genes that leads to replication and pathogenicity. This is done by deleting coding regions of the viral genome and replacing them with the DNA to be delivered, which either integrates into host chromosomal DNA or exists as an episomal vector. Viral vectors were first employed for gene delivery from the 1970s, constructed from SV40

or retroviruses
.
Newer generations of viral vector platforms have been produced based on components from lentivirus, retrovirus, adenovirus or adeno-associated virus, and other viruses
.
While highly efficient for DNA delivery, notable weaknesses of viral vectors are (1) labor-intensive and expensive protocols, (2) safety issues, (3) risk of causing immune/ inflammatory responses, (4) integration into the genome with recombinant vectors, (5) risk of insertional genotoxicity, and (6) limited packaging capacity (Adeno and AAV typically restricted to carry 5−7.5 kb).

Nanoparticles for transfection. The most commonly used nanoparticles for intracellular delivery of nucleic acids are based on assemblies of cationic lipids and polymers. These cationic molecules condense DNA plasmids (~50-200 nm), mRNA (10-100 nm) and other nucleic acids (see "Properties of common molecules of interest for intracellular delivery") into compact nanoparticles with dimensions down to tens of nanometers. The positive charge of these particles facilitates their attraction to the cell surface due to the natural negative charge of most animal cells (−35 to −80 mV membrane potential). Upon binding, endocytosis is thought to be most efficient for particles in the size range below 100 nm
. 
Complexation into nanoparticles also confers protection for nucleic acids against degradation until they are released to the appropriate intracellular compartment
.

From the 1960s it was observed that mixing nucleic acids with cationic molecules leads to the formation of macromolecular complexes that can transfect cells. Two early examples were the polymer diethylaminoethyl-dextran(DEAE-dextran)/nucleic acid combination (1968)

and the insoluble ionic salt calcium phosphate/nucleic acid precipitant (1973)
.
The use of cationic lipids for transfection began in the 1980s

, was termed "lipofection", and became the basis for the popular product lipofectamine launched in 1993. Other cationic transfection reagents were developed in the 1990s based on dendrimers such as PAMAM

in 1993 (“superfect” reagent launched in late 1990s) and cationic polymers such as PEI in 1995
 (marketed as “polyjet” soon after). Currently in research, most nucleic acid transfection is performed with lipid reagents, with polymer reagents and electroporation as other major options. Certain recalcitrant cells or in vivo applications may be better suited for viral vectors
.

Technical Advances

Improving Precision of Membrane Disruption

Advancements in microfabrication, nanotechnology, chemistry and other research fields have contributed to the improvements in precision and performance of intracellular delivery methods
.

Electroporation.
Early versions of electroporation used bulk electrodes to apply electrical pulses of defined voltage to cells in solution in a cuvette
.
Electroporation was then brought down to the microscale through the use of microfluidics in the late 90s
. Following that nano-electroporation was achieved through the use of nanoapertures and nanostraws. 
The nano and micro versions of electroporation feature much higher precision and control over the size and location of membrane disruptions imposed on target cells
.
A company called Maxcyte has developed a high-throughput version of flow electroporation that can process hundreds of millions of cells in tens of minutes
.
Furthermore, other research groups have employed deep learning to improve electroporation parameters in high throughput multi-well systems
.

Mechanical Contact.
The first versions of intracellular delivery protocols exploiting the mechanical force of objects striking the cell membrane were simple and crude methods such as scrape loading and glass bead loading
.
In scrape loading, for example, a spatula is dragged across adherent cells that have been cultured on a flat substrate. As the cells peel off the substrate they undergo a variable amount of membrane damage and are able to take up molecules in solution. Scrape and bead loading have been used in many biological studies to introduce proteins and small molecules into cells
.

Since the late 1990s researchers have worked to improve the precision of solid contract-based membrane disruption through the use of nanoneedles and microfabricated devices
.
Nanoneedles were first used for nucleic acid transfection in 2003

then demonstrated delivery of diverse cargoes in 2010
.
They have been combined with electroporation, flow reservoirs, and detergents to add more functionality
.
Moreover, nanostraws have been used to both insert and extract molecules into cells in a time-resolved manner
.

In 1999 it was found that passing cells through holes in polycarbonate filters created temporary disruptions in the cell membrane to achieve DNA transfection
.
The method was termed "filtroporation" and did not receive much attention at the time. In 2012 researchers at MIT found that passing cells through constrictions in silicon microfluidic devices was capable of disrupting the cell membrane to achieve intracellular delivery of diverse materials
.
The method, termed cell squeezing, was spun out into a company called SQZ biotech that focuses on leveraging intracellular delivery technology to develop cell-based therapies. By adjusting the flow speed of cells and the shape and size of microfluidic constriction, cell squeezing can be tailored for different cell types and delivery applications. Other research groups have demonstrated the cell squeezing concept in microsieves and PDMS-based microfluidic devices
.

Cell squeezing has been combined with electroporation to achieve rapid delivery of DNA and other materials into the nucleus
. This works by first introducing holes into the plasma membrane, then having an electrical pulse serve to 1) disrupt the nuclear membrane, and 2) drive negatively charged nucleic acids into the cell
. 
Microfluidic cell squeezing followed by downstream electroporation has been shown to cause temporary disruptions in nuclear membrane that were repaired within 15 minutes
.

Fluid Shear.
Early examples of using fluid shear forces to controllably disrupt the cell membrane include conventional ultrasound

, syringe loading for cells in suspension

and the use of cone-plate viscometers on adherent cells
.
In syringe loading, suspensions of cells are sucked and expelled from a syringe through a fine needle tip. The fluid shear forces at the tip of the needle depend upon the flow velocity and can be tailored to disrupt the cell membrane. Since the 1990s, more precise strategies to employ fluid shear forces to permeabilize cells include microfluidics, ultrasound, shock waves, and laser-based methods
.

Laser irradiance of an absorbent object in an aqueous environment can produce a variety of effects including cavitation, plasma production, chemical reactions, and heat
.
Both laser-particle and laser-surface interactions have been exploited to create cavitation events that expose cells to locally concentrated fluid shear forces. For example, a metallic nanostructure can be used as a seed structure to harvest short laser pulse energy and convert it into highly localized explosive vapor bubbles. A high throughput version of this concept was unveiled in 2015

Substrates arrayed with pores lined by metallic absorbers were irradiated to generate exploding cavitation bubbles underneath the basal side of adherent cells. Membrane permeabilization was synchronized with active pumping of cargo through the pores to successfully introduce living bacteria (>1 micron) into the cytoplasm of several cell types.

Thermal Effects.
A simple way of delivering molecules into cells is to heat the plasma membrane until holes form. At sufficiently high temperatures, lipid bilayers will dissociate due to kinetic energy of the constituent molecules being greater than the forces that maintain the membrane formation, namely the hydrophobic forces that repel water from the lipid tails.
The downside of this method is that it is incredibly non-specific and may cause excessive harm to cells. Strategies for permeabilizing cells by thermal means include (1) cycling cells through a cooling−heating cycle, which may or may not involve freezing, (2) heating cells to supraphysiological temperatures, and (3) transient intense heating of a small part of the cell.
In the latter case, thermal inkjet printers have been successfully used for intracellular delivery and transfection in animal cells.
Laser-particle interactions have been reported to precisely thermally disrupt cell membranes. Gold nanoparticles were packed into a dense surface layer where >10 s of infrared laser irradiation heats the underside of cells to trigger permeabilization and delivery of dyes, dextrans and plasmids.
In 2021 this concept was developed further when researchers showed that light-sensitive iron oxide nanoparticles embedded in biocompatible electrospun nanofibres can trigger membrane permeabilization by photothermal effects without direct contact between cells and nanoparticles
.
This method was capable of delivering CRISPR–Cas9 machinery and siRNA to adherent and suspension cells, including embryonic stem cells and hard-to-transfect T cells.

Biochemical Enhancement of Cargo and Carriers

mRNA medicines.
Advances in lipid nanoparticle formulation and nucleic acid chemistry have been critical in the development of nucleic acid therapeutics, such as mRNA vaccines. For example, design of the cationic ionizable lipids, which are a key component of lipid nanoparticle formulations, with an acid dissociation constant (pKa) close to the early endosomal pH enable endosomal release into the cytoplasm after endocytosis
.
In the Moderna covid vaccine lipid nanoparticles are composed of ionizable lipid SM-102, cholesterol, 1,2-distearoyl-snglycero-3 phosphocholine (DSPC) and PEG2000-DMG to encapsulate mRNA. The Pfizer/BioNTech covid vaccines employ ALC-0315 lipid from Acuitas Therapeutics and formulate it with cholesterol, DSPC, and a PEG-Lipid (ALC-0159) together with mRNA
.
After intramuscular injection, the nanoparticles enter cells, mRNA is released into the cytoplasm, and the expression of SARS-CoV2 spike protein occurs in patient cells.

siRNA Medicines.
patisiran, the first siRNA based medicine to receive regulatory approval from the FDA in 2018, is based on lipid nanoparticle formulations that package and delivery siRNA to the liver for the silencing of an abnormal pathogenic form of transthyretin gene. The therapeutic siRNA is formulated with 2 lipid excipients, DLin-MC3-DMA and PEG2000-C-DMG, in a lipid nanoparticle that is intravenously infused into the patient and targets hepatocytes in the liver. Moreover, Chemically modified nucleotides in siRNA therapeutics improve chemical stability and efficacy, assist in targeting certain cell types, and serve to reduce adverse immunological reactions
.
Diverse ligands including small molecules, carbohydrates, aptamers, peptides and antibodies have been covalently linked to siRNA in order to improve cellular uptake and target specific cell types. For example, GalNAc-siRNA conjugates not only provide an approach for ligand based cell internalization without the need of cationic materials, but also target hepatocytes specifically
. GalNAc-siRNA conjugates were employed in the second FDA-approved siRNA medicine, Givosiran, which is administered to treat acute Hepatic Porphyria by down-regulating ALAS1 expression in the liver.

ASO Medicines.
The first approved antisense oligonucleotides (ASO) medication was unveiled in 1998 with fomivirsen, a 21-mer oligonucleotide that blocks the translation of cytomegalovirus mRNA
.
By binding pre-mRNA or mRNA, ASOs can post-transcriptionally regulate protein synthesis through mechanisms including modification of pre-mRNA processing and splicing, competitive inhibition, steric blockade of translational machinery, and degradation of bound target RNA
.
Chemical modifications of ASO nucleosides, nucleobases, and the internucleoside backbone are key for improving pharmacokinetics and pharmacodynamics while maintaining target affinity and efficacy. Therapeutically effective ASOs are heavily modified, so they do not require a carrier for intracellular delivery. Most medically applicable ASOs are naked molecules that are able to enter cells through endocytosis and exert their therapeutic effects by binding their intracellular target
.

Improved Viral Vectors.
Nearly 70% of gene therapy clinical trials have utilized viral vectors for the gene delivery step
.
Adenovirus, Adeno-associated virus (AAV) and lentiviral vectors are currently the main viral vectors used in biotechnology and clinical applications
.
AAV is as a prominent example of improvements made in viral vectors. Vector engineering can increase AAV transduction efficiency (by optimizing the transgene cassette), vector tropism (using capsid engineering) and the ability of the capsid and transgene to avoid the host immune response (by genetically modifying these components), as well as optimize the large-scale production of AAV

Moreover, vector engineering approaches including directed evolution have greatly enhanced the efficiency and targeting of AAV vectors, resulting in >100-fold improvement in delivery efficiency in some cases.
In another example of AAV engineering, machine learning has been applied to generate AAV variants that can circumvent immune responses from previous exposure
.

Virus-like Particles.
Virus-like particles (VLPs) are assemblies of viral proteins that package cargo materials such as mRNAs, proteins, or RNPs in addition to, or instead of, viral genetic material. Because VLPs are derived from existing viral scaffolds, they exploit natural properties of viruses that enable efficient intracellular delivery, including their ability to encapsulate cargos, escape endosomes, and be reprogrammed to target different cell types. However, unlike viruses, VLPs can deliver their cargo as mRNA or protein instead of as DNA, which substantially reduces the risks of viral genome integration. VLPs are thus of interest for delivering molecular cargo such as gene editing agents as they can offer benefits of both viral and non-viral delivery
.
Engineered DNA-free VLPs have recently been shown to efficiently package and deliver base editor or Cas9 ribonucleoproteins to mammalian cells for the purpose of gene editing

It was reported that delivery of gene editing proteins with VLPs offered substantially minimized off-target editing compared with plasmid and viral delivery in vitro.

References 

Gene delivery
Biotechnology